Paul Gay (born 8 November 1968) is a notable  French bass-baritone who sings opera and other classical forms.  He has performed in France, Germany, Russia, and the United States, with a number of significant companies and directors.

Gay's singing as Temrouk in Georges Bizet's Ivan IV was criticized by "Classics Today.com".  He showed some early promise, according to auditions.  He was termed "a reliable Masetto" in Mozart's Don Giovanni.

Gay has secured some title roles.  On 2 February 2008 he appeared on NPR in the title role in Édouard Lalo's The King of Ys.  In August 2009, he performed the title role of St. Paul in Felix Mendelssohn's 1836 oratorio, St. Paul, with Leon Botstein conducting.

References

External links
 Personal website in English
 
 Downloads available for Paul Gay on Naxos.com

1968 births
Living people
20th-century French male opera singers
21st-century French male opera singers